The Big Take is a 2018 American thriller comedy film written and directed by Justin Daly and starring James McCaffrey, Ebon Moss-Bachrach, Zoë Bell, Bill Sage, Dan Hedaya and Robert Forster.  It is Daly's feature directorial debut.

Cast
Robert Forster
James McCaffrey
Ebon Moss-Bachrach
Zoë Bell
Bill Sage
Dan Hedaya
Oksana Lada
Slate Holmgren

Release
The film was released on DVD and digital platforms on September 4, 2018.

Reception
Anthony Ray Bench of Film Threat awarded the film an 8 out of 10.

References

External links
 
 

American comedy thriller films
2010s English-language films
2010s American films